Talleyville is an unincorporated community in New Castle County, Delaware, United States. Talleyville is located at the intersection of U.S. Route 202, Mt. Lebanon Road, and Silverside Road to the north of Wilmington. Its ZIP code is 19803.

The population of the ZCTA for ZIP code 19803 was 21,022 at the 2000 census.  The William Hicklen House was listed on the National Register of Historic Places in 1983.

It was a distinct census-designated place for the 1990 U.S. Census.

The Talleys were a prominent family in the Brandywine Hundred.

Education 
Talleyville is in the Brandywine School District.

See also
William Talley House (Wilmington, Delaware)
Talleys Corner, Delaware

References

External links

Unincorporated communities in New Castle County, Delaware
Unincorporated communities in Delaware